Jane Ayiyem (born 19 October 1997) is a Ghanaian international footballer who plays as a forward for the Ghana women's national football team. She competed for Ghana at the 2018 Africa Women Cup of Nations, playing in three matches.

In 2012, 2013, and 2014 Ghana Sports Writers Association of Ghana "SWAG" Awards, Jane Ayieyam won the best Female Footballer of the year and also the 2012 female top Scorer with 18 Goals.

International goals

References

1997 births
Living people
Ghanaian women's footballers
Ghana women's international footballers
Women's association football forwards
Police Ladies F.C. (Ghana) players